The GOKDENIZ complex along with Aselsan ATOM 35mm airburst ammunition is an all-weather-capable Turkish 35 mm dual barrel close-in weapon system (CIWS) developed by Aselsan. It is a CIWS variant of KORKUT Self-propelled anti-aircraft gun.

Each GOKDENIZ platform carries a variant of Oerlikon 35 mm twin cannon, manufactured under licence by MKEK. The CIWS system, sensors and electronics manufactured by Aselsan. The CIWS can fire up to 1100 rounds a minute up to an effective range of 4 km.

Purpose
The system's primary purpose is to defend against anti-ship missiles, unmanned aerial vehicles and other precision guided weapons. It can also be employed against conventional and rotary-wing aircraft, surface ships, small water-crafts, coastal targets and floating mines.

Ammunition
The cannons fire  35×228 mm Aselsan ATOM 35mm airburst round and High-explosive incendiary (HEI) ammunition.

In the anti-missile role it uses ATOM 35mm airburst ammunition from Aselsan. This round ejects tungsten pellets at a predetermined distance. It is a smart ammunition which has a base fuse. Together with the ability of precise time counting and the capability of being programmed during firing by taking muzzle velocity into consideration automatically sets the fuse to detonate the round as it approaches a pre-set distance from the target. Whilst a single pellet is too small to do major damage in itself, the accumulation of damage from multiple strikes is designed to destroy wings and control surfaces, sensors and aerodynamics, causing the target to crash. According to Aselsan, the ammunition is resistant against electromagnetic jamming. On the other hand, HEI ammunition designed to impart energy and therefore damage to its target in one or both of two ways: via a high-explosive charge and/or via its incendiary (fire-causing) effects. They caused fires, which on ships can be difficult to extinguish.

The system allows loading of both  ammunition at the same time and it can switch between ammunition type with automatic linkless ammunition feed mechanism when needed during the operation.

Variant

GOKDENIZ ER
This is a further variation of the GOKDENIZ close-in weapon system. It was one of the two point-defense weapon systems from Turkey presented during the International Defense Exhibition and Fair (IDEF) 21. The GOKDENIZ-ER will operate independently of ship sensors and systems, be armed with 11 missiles, and provide 360-degree coverage through AESA radar and electro-optical sensors.

The system is still under development. It be developed independently of ROKETSAN's Levent system, and is seen as an alternative to SeaRAM Block-2. The system will have less missiles than Levent, but the missiles will be larger. Because of the involvement of TÜBTAK-SAGE in the project, it is expected that the surface-to-air version of the Bozdogan missile, an indigenous air-to-air missile produced by TÜBTAK-SAGE, will be preferred. Nonetheless, the possibility of employing a more powerful and larger version of the SUNGUR Missiles is also being considered.

Operators
Current Operator

 Turkmenistan

  Turkmen Naval Forces: Use on Turkmen-class corvettes

Future Operators

: Will be used in Babur-class corvette

 : To be used on Istanbul-class frigate

 : To be used on Ada-class corvette Hetman Ivan Mazepa.

Similar
Oerlikon Millennium 35 mm Naval Revolver Gun System—comparable Swiss-German system
Nächstbereichschutzsystem MANTIS ground-based C-RAM by Rheinmetall using same gun
Oerlikon 35 mm twin cannon earlier system using AHEAD rounds
Denel 35mm Dual Purpose Gun comparable South African CIWS
Polish PIT-RADWAR OSU-35K 35mm Naval Gun System single barrel CIWS
Polish PIT-RADWAR AG-35 and A-35 35mm Ground based anti aircraft Gun System single barrel.

References

Close-in weapon systems
Naval anti-aircraft guns
Autocannon
35 mm artillery
Aselsan products
Military equipment introduced in the 2010s
Naval weapons of Turkey